Home Run Derby is a 1960 television show that was held at Wrigley Field in Los Angeles pitting the top sluggers of Major League Baseball against each other in nine-inning home run contests. The show was produced and hosted by actor/broadcaster Mark Scott and distributed by Ziv Television Programs.

Filmed in December 1959, the series aired in syndication from January 9 to July 2, 1960, and helped inspire the Home Run Derby event that is now held the day before the annual Major League Baseball All-Star Game. ESPN staged a revival of the show in 1989.

Play

Each batter had nine innings to hit as many home runs as possible. Each inning consisted of three outs, and any ball not hit for a home run, including called strikes, would be recorded as an out. If the two batters tied, extra innings would be played until the tie was broken.

Wrigley Field in Los Angeles had an inner fence with palm trees and a brick wall located several feet behind it. Any pitch hit in that direction had to clear the wall or hit the top of the trees that stuck out over the wall to count as a home run. Outer wall distances were 339 feet in right and 340 feet in left.

While one player was taking his turn at bat, the other player would sit at the host's booth and have a brief conversation, typically unrehearsed small talk about the contest or the player's performance that season. Willie Mays, who was a champion later in the run after losing in the initial contest to Mickey Mantle, joked with host Scott during his run that the host should be quiet while he batted for his third consecutive home run (for which Mays would receive a $500 bonus). Scott took him up on it, speaking into the microphone sotto voce, similar to a bowling or golf announcer, whenever Mays stepped up to the plate. Sometimes when the batter hit a ball into the deep outfield, the player in the booth would comment that it would have gone for extra bases in a real game, to which Scott replied that "on Home Run Derby it's nothing but an out". Some players wore golf gloves during the show—a notable addition because the batting glove was still years away from being a normal part of a player's gear.

Participants

Nineteen players, including nine future members of the Baseball Hall of Fame, participated in the series — "almost all the power hitters of the era."

One pitcher for the show was former major leaguer Tom Saffell and the catcher was minor leaguer John VanOrnum, later a San Francisco Giants' coach. Art Passarella, a former American League umpire who would go on to a TV acting career, served as the plate umpire. There were also umpires along both foul lines to help judge fly balls that were close calls.

Venue choice
Scott noted that Wrigley Field in Los Angeles was chosen to host the event because its fence distances were symmetrical, favoring neither right-handed nor left-handed hitters. Despite Scott's assertions, the left field wall was actually a few feet higher than the right field wall, which slightly penalized right-handed line-drive hitters such as Gus Triandos. The Los Angeles Dodgers played at the Memorial Coliseum during 1958–1961, a site that would have given an unfair advantage to right-handed batters.

Prizes
The winner received a check for $2,000 and was invited back for the next week's episode against a new opponent (a rarity in that era for syndicated games); the runner-up received a check for $1,000. If a batter hit three home runs in a row, he would receive a $500 bonus check. A fourth home run in a row would be worth another $500 bonus check. Any consecutive home runs hit beyond that would each be worth $1,000. Each show would end with the host presenting each player with their prize checks (beginning with the loser), and would award separate checks for consecutive home run bonuses. These were actual bank checks, not the jumbo "display" checks typically used today. For example, if the winner hit three homers in a row, they would receive one check for $2,000 and another for $500 instead of one check for $2,500. As an incentive for throwing good home-run-hitting balls, the pitcher who threw the most pitches for home runs also received a bonus, according to the host.

Unlike more recent home run derbies, which usually award prizes in the form of donations to a player's choice of charity, the economic realities of the era meant that the cash prizes earned by the players on the show were a substantial income supplement.

Records
The most home runs in a derby was 25, in the Jackie Jensen vs. Ernie Banks contest (14–11), while the fewest was four, in the Hank Aaron vs. Duke Snider contest (3–1).

Jensen's 14 home runs against Banks were the most a player hit in a single contest.  Only one home run was recorded in a contest three times; by Snider, Al Kaline, and Gus Triandos.

Mickey Mantle hit the most home runs on the show, a total of 44 during his five appearances.

Aaron won the most money during the show's run, $13,500. Snider, Kaline, and Triandos each won the minimum of $1,000.

Aaron had the best overall record at 6–1, while Rocky Colavito and Jim Lemon were each 0–2.

Jensen was the only player to hit four and subsequently five home runs in a row, doing so in the fourth inning of the final episode.

Snider and Eddie Mathews were the only left-handed batters to compete. Switch-hitter Mantle batted right-handed in the contests; he hit 372 homers left-handed in his career and only 164 right-handed, but he chose to bat exclusively right-handed for this series, commenting in the first episode that his longest home runs had come right-handed.

Triandos was the only catcher to participate on the program; despite never hitting more than 30 home runs in a season and ending his career with 167 home runs, he was chosen because he was the best power-hitting catcher in the major leagues at the time. He also took until the seventh inning to hit his first home run, the longest such drought in a contest, and just surpassing Snider, who hit a home run off the trees in the sixth inning of his contest vs. Aaron. Triandos was nonetheless good-natured, treating his futility with a mix of self-deprecation and humorous sarcasm, and wishing Dick Stuart luck after their competition.

Demise
Scott's play-by-play and interviewing style was not very different from many of the announcers of that era (straightforward and upbeat). Scott died on July 13, 1960, from a heart attack at the age of 45; in the wake of his death, the producers decided not to replace him and instead canceled the show. (Benjamin Stoloff, the series director, died September 8 of the same year.)

ESPN revival
In 2003 and 2004, the Major League Baseball Players Association held similar contests at Cashman Field in Las Vegas, Nevada. The contests were held just before spring training, consisted of eight-man elimination tournaments, and were televised on ESPN. The contests lasted for only five innings.

Episode status
The original series is intact, having been rerun on ESPN from December 17 to 28, 1988, and July 10 to October 28, 1989. Its rights now belong to MGM Television. The series proved popular and was credited in part with the establishment of a classic sports network which would eventually become ESPN Classic.

ESPN Classic ran the program in primetime in September and November 2009 after a 2-year hiatus, and still occasionally carried episodes in middays thereafter. In later years the intro, as well as some comments at the close of the show, were narrated by former Los Angeles Dodgers announcer Ross Porter.

In the summer of 2007, MGM Home Entertainment (with distribution by 20th Century Fox Home Entertainment) released the complete series on DVD in three volumes. The complete series is also available on the iTunes Store.

Results

References

Further reading

External links
 
 Announcement of ESPN's revival

Major League Baseball on television
First-run syndicated television programs in the United States
1960s American game shows
1960 American television series debuts
1960 American television series endings
2000s American game shows
2003 American television series debuts
2004 American television series endings
Television series by MGM Television
English-language television shows
Black-and-white American television shows
Television game shows with incorrect disambiguation
Television series by Ziv Television Programs